Lichenosticta is a genus of fungi of uncertain familial placement in the order Lecanorales. It has five species. All species are lichenicolous, meaning they are parasitic on lichens.

Species

Lichenosticta alcicorniaria  – host = Cladonia
Lichenosticta dombrovskae  – host = Stereocaulon
Lichenosticta hoegnabbae  – host = Cladia
Lichenosticta jurgae  – host = Lecanora
Lichenosticta lecanorae  – host = Lecanora

References

Lecanorales
Ascomycota genera
Taxa described in 1898
Taxa named by Friedrich Wilhelm Zopf
Lichenicolous fungi